Grace Jacob Bullen (born 7 February 1997) is a Norwegian freestyle wrestler. She won the silver medal in the 59kg event at the 2022 World Wrestling Championships held in Belgrade, Serbia. She is a two-time gold medalist at the European Wrestling Championships. She also won a bronze medal for Norway at the 2015 European Games held in Baku, Azerbaijan.

Early life 

Born in a refugee camp in Eritrea to South Sudanese parents, she moved to Fredrikstad, Norway in 2001 at the age of four. Already at the age of four she took up wrestling in the martial arts club Atlas.

Career 

At the 2014 Summer Youth Olympics held in Nanjing, China, she represented Norway and she won the gold medal in the girls' 60 kg event. In the final, she defeated Pei Xingru of China. In 2015, she represented Norway at the European Games held in Baku, Azerbaijan and she won one of the bronze medals in the women's 58 kg event. She lost her first match against Emese Barka of Hungary and entered the repechage. Here she won against Valeria Koblova by walkover and she defeated Irina Netreba of Azerbaijan in the bronze medal match. She also competed in the women's 58 kg event at the 2015 World Wrestling Championships held in Las Vegas, United States where she was eliminated in her second match by Marianna Sastin of Hungary.

In 2016, she won the silver medal in the women's 58 kg at the European Wrestling Championships held in Riga, Latvia. In the final, she lost against Nataliya Synyshyn of Azerbaijan. The following year, she won the gold medal in the same event at the 2017 European Wrestling Championships held in Novi Sad, Serbia. In the final, she defeated Mariana Cherdivara of Moldova. In the same year, she was eliminated in her first match in the women's 58 kg event at the 2017 World Wrestling Championships held in Paris, France.

In 2018, she competed in the 57 kg event at the World Wrestling Championships held in Budapest, Hungary. She won her first match against Giullia Penalber of Brazil and her next match against Jong In-sun of North Korea. She then lost her next match against Rong Ningning of China; Rong went on to win the gold medal. Bullen then failed to secure the bronze medal in her match against Pooja Dhanda of India. A month later, at the 2018 World U23 Wrestling Championship held in Bucharest, Romania, she won the gold medal in the women's 59 kg event.

In 2019, she won one of the bronze medals in the women's 57 kg event at the Golden Grand Prix Ivan Yarygin held in Krasnoyarsk, Russia. In the same year, she also competed in the 57 kg event at the 2019 European Games held in Minsk, Belarus where she lost her bronze medal match against Anastasia Nichita of Moldova. In 2020, she won the gold medal in the 57 kg event at the European Wrestling Championships held in Rome, Italy. In the final, she defeated Alina Akobiia of Ukraine.

In March 2021, she competed at the European Qualification Tournament in Budapest, Hungary hoping to qualify for the 2020 Summer Olympics in Tokyo, Japan. Her hopes were dashed when she was eliminated in her first match by Bediha Gün of Turkey. A month later, she was eliminated in her second match in the 59 kg event at the 2021 European Wrestling Championships held in Warsaw, Poland. In May 2021, she failed to qualify for the Olympics at the World Qualification Tournament held in Sofia, Bulgaria. She won her first two matches but she was then eliminated in the semi-finals by Veronika Chumikova. In October 2021, she was eliminated in her first match in the women's 59 kg event at the World Wrestling Championships held in Oslo, Norway.

In 2022, she won the gold medal in her event at the Matteo Pellicone Ranking Series 2022 held in Rome, Italy. She won the silver medal in the 59kg event at the 2022 World Wrestling Championships held in Belgrade, Serbia.

Achievements

References

External links 

 

1997 births
Living people
South Sudanese expatriates in Eritrea
South Sudanese emigrants to Norway
Sportspeople from Fredrikstad
Norwegian female sport wrestlers
Youth Olympic gold medalists for Norway
Wrestlers at the 2014 Summer Youth Olympics
World Wrestling Championships medalists
European Wrestling Championships medalists
European Games bronze medalists for Norway
European Games medalists in wrestling
Wrestlers at the 2015 European Games
Wrestlers at the 2019 European Games
European Wrestling Champions
21st-century Norwegian women